On a Distant Shore is an album by singer, multi-instrumentalist and songwriter Leon Russell. Produced by Mark Lambert and Leon Russell, the album was released on  September 22, 2017, Leon's 38th album on Palmetto Records. On a Distant Shore is Leon's last album, as he died in November 2016, aged 74. The album was recorded at ThirtySeventeen studio in Nashville Tennessee in 2016.  Leon Russell's daughter, Coco Bridges, performs backing vocals on the album and also did the album cover painting. Leon Russell's daughter, Sugaree Noel Bridges, performs backing vocals on the album.  Russell reinterpreted “This Masquerade,” ″Hummingbird” and “A Song for You” three of his best-known songs, he also added an orchestral arrangements by Larry Hall.

In 2010 Sugaree Noel Bridges released her first album The American Dream on Leon Russell Records 
Sugaree and CoCo are children from Leon's marriage to Janet Lee Constantine, whom he married on February 6, 1983. They had three daughters together, Sugaree Noel (born October 9, 1982), Honey (born January 19, 1986), and Coco (born April 29, 1990).

Hal Horowitz with American Songwriter reviewed the album: "Russell wrote 13 new songs, clearly in the style of those sung by Sinatra, Mel Torme and the crooners of the ‘30s-‘50s. Co-producer Mark Lambert then worked with arranger Larry Hall to add full orchestral backing to the songs, including harps, swelling strings, bold horns and even angelic background vocalists." "This is the album he wanted to leave as his legacy. As such, it’s a significant, often impressive work from one of rock and roll’s true icons who has chosen a unique and, to many, surprisingly starry-eyed way to say goodbye."

Track listing
All songs performed and written by Leon Russell (Matt Harris joining Leon on # 3)	
1 On a Distant Shore 	3:16 	
2 Love This Way 	3:50 	
3 Here Without You    by Matt Harris  and Leon 	3:51 	
4 This Masquerade	4:41 
5 Black and Blue	3:16 	
6 Just Leaves and Grass	5:02 	
7 On the Waterfront	3:31 	
8 Easy to Love	4:07 	
9 Hummingbird 3:10 		
10 The One I Love Is Wrong 3:27 	
11 Were Do We Go From Here 3:35 	
12 A Song for You 3:35

Personnel
Leon Russell 	Bass, Composer, Keyboards, Primary Artist, Producer, Vocals 
Coco Bridges 	Cover Painting, Vocals
Sugaree Noel Bridges 	Vocals
Mike Brignardello Bass
Ray Goren Featured Artist
Larry Hall 	Guitar, Horn, Keyboards, Orchestral Arrangements, Strings
Tony Harrell 	Keyboards
Drew Lambert 	Bass
Mark Lambert 	Engineer, Guitar, Liner Notes, Mixing, Producer, Vocals
Chris Leuzinger 	Guitar
Greg Morrow 	Drums
Russ Pahl 	Guitar (Steel)
Andre Reiss 	Guitar
Eddie Kramer 	Engineer, Mixing
Shawn Davies 	Graphic Design

References

External links
Leon Russell discography
Leon Russell lyrics
Leon Russell NAMM Oral History Program Interview (2012)

2017 albums
Leon Russell albums